The 1991 Cork Senior Hurling Championship was the 103rd staging of the Cork Senior Hurling Championship since its establishment by the Cork County Board in 1887. The draw for the opening fixtures took place on 16 December 1990. The championship began on 28 April 1991 and ended on 22 September 1991.

Na Piarsaigh entered the championship as the defending champions, however, they were defeated by Blackrock in the second round.

The final was played on 22 September 1991 at Páirc Uí Chaoimh in Cork between Midleton and Glen Rovers, in what was their first meeting in a final in 53 years. Midleton won the match by 1-17 to 1-08 to claim their seventh championship title overall and their first title since 1987.

Ger Riordan was the championship's top scorer with 1-22.

Results

First round

Second round

Quarter-finals

Semi-finals

Finals

Championship statistics

Top scorers

Overall

In a single game

Miscellaneous

 Ballyhea recorded their first ever championship victory over Blackrock.
 The final meeting of Midleton and Glen Rovers was their first championship meeting since 1938.

References

Cork Senior Hurling Championship
Cork Senior Hurling Championship